Syenogranite is a fine to coarse grained intrusive igneous rock of the same general composition as granite. They are characteristically felsic. 

The feldspar component of syenogranite is predominantly alkaline in character (usually orthoclase). For example, the syenogranite in the Salmon Mountains in Idaho is pink to tan and composed of 45–55% alkali feldspar, 15–20% plagioclase, 15–20% quartz, 5–8% biotite, 3–5% hornblende, and accessory magnetite (Evans and Green, 2003).

Syenogranite is similar to syenite, however the major difference is its higher content of quartz (15-25%) usually at the expense of some alkali feldspar (45-50%), the domination of biotite over hornblende and the presence of muscovite and rutile as additional accessories in the syenogranite. Some syenogranite contain rare idiomorphic amphibole (Fe-hornblende and Fe-edenite), biotite (annite 25%-35%), plagioclase (An3), along with K-feldspar and quartz. (Mafti, 2001).

In the Sao Jose do Campestre Massif in Brazil, the syenogranite is a coarse-grained rock composed of microcline, quartz, hornblende, and rare clinopyroxene, together with allanite, as essential minerals (Benjamin et al., 1998).

See also
 syenite
 monzogranite
 granite

References
 Bley, Benjamin, Peter Christian Hackspacher, Elton Luizdantas, and William Randall Van Schmus. (1998) "Archean Accretion in the Sao Jose do Campestre Massif, Borborema Province, Northeast Brazil." Revista Brasileirade Geociencias, Vol. 28 
 Karl V. Evans and Gregory N. Green (2003) “Geological Map of the Salmon National Forest and Vicinity, East-Central Idaho.”  U.S. Department of the Interior, U. S. Geological Survey.
 Mafti, Mohammed Rashad H. (2001) "Age, Geochemistry and Origin of the Peraluminous A-Type Granitoids of the Ablah-Shuwas Pluton, Ablah Graben Arabian Shield." Faculty of Earth Sciences, King Abdulaziz University, Acta Mineralogica-Petrographica, Vol. 42, pp. 5–20.

Plutonic rocks